Gujarati may refer to:

 something of, from, or related to Gujarat, a state of India
 Gujarati people, the major ethnic group of Gujarat
 Gujarati language, the Indo-Aryan language spoken by them
 Gujarati languages, the Western Indo-Aryan sub-family which includes Gujarati
 Gujarati alphabet
 Gujarati (Unicode block), a block of Gujarati characters in Unicode
 Gujarati, a style of sari draping
 Gujarati (magazine), a magazine published from 1880 to 1929

See also
 Gujarati cuisine
 Gujarati culture
 Gujari language, an Indo-Aryan language
 Gujrat (disambiguation)

Language and nationality disambiguation pages